Fox the Fox was a group that was founded in 1981 by Berth Tamaëla and Sylvia Musmin, also known as Silhouette Musmin. The band is best known for their hit single "Precious Little Diamond".

History 
Fox the Fox, was a Dutch funk band founded by Tamaëla and Musmin in 1981. Among the members were bassist Gino Jansen, guitarist Kier van der Werf, keyboardist Roy Kuschel, and drummers Robbie Brans, Tjalling Bos and Han Langkamp. Musmin wrote all the lyrics.
Two years after founding the band they released "Flirting and Showing", which reached number 40 in the Netherlands and Germany.  A year later they released the single "Precious Little Diamond", which reached fifth place in Germany, number 18 on the U.S. Billboard Hot Dance Music/Club Play, 11 in the Netherlands, 15 in France, 38 in Belgium and 86 in the United Kingdom.  Subsequent singles and albums were not successful.

The band split up after the departure of Tamaëla in 1990. Silhouette Musmin has retired from the music business and is now a practitioner of alternative medicine in Amsterdam, while Berth Tamaëla is still making music and his most recent act is called Beat-T.

Discography 
Singles
Flirting And Showing
: 40
: 40 – 1984/49  
Precious Little Diamond
: 5 – 1984/31  – 6 Wo.
: 18 - U.S. Billboard Hot Dance Music/Club Play 
: 11
: 15
: 38
: 86

Albums 
 1984: In the Dark of the Nite
 1989: Diamonds

Singles 
 1983: Flirting and Showing
 1984: Precious Little Diamond
 1984: I.C. Eyes
 1984: Stealin' (My Heart Away)
 1986: She Don't Mind
 1987: Star in the Nite (Too Late)
 1989: Rock the Pop
 1989: Something Special

External links 

LastFM Profile

References 

Dutch musical groups
Eurodisco groups
Musical groups established in 1981
Musical groups disestablished in 1990
Dutch funk musical groups